Roynell Young (born December 1, 1957) is a former professional American football safety and cornerback who played for the Philadelphia Eagles his entire National Football League (NFL) career, from 1980 to 1988. Young was selected by the Eagles from Alcorn State University in the first round (23rd overall) of the 1980 NFL Draft. In his rookie year, he played in Super Bowl XV and was selected to the Pro Bowl in his second season. He was one of two players who played in both Super Bowl XV and The Fog Bowl for the Eagles. The other was offensive lineman Ron Baker.   Young was inducted to the Alcorn State University Sports Hall of Fame in November 2017.

In 1990, Young founded "Pro-Vision", a youth and community development organization. Originally a youth mentoring program, Young grew Pro-Vision to include an all-male charter middle school, now a co-educational primary and secondary school.

References

1957 births
Living people
American football safeties
American football cornerbacks
Alcorn State Braves football players
Philadelphia Eagles players
National Conference Pro Bowl players
Players of American football from New Orleans